Hatbor is a small town in Nagaon district, Assam under Kaliabor sub division.

Villages in Nagaon district